Abraham Kunio González Uyeda (born September 14, 1996 in Mexico) is a Mexican politician and the current Secretary for Economic Development of the State of Jalisco since December, 2006. He graduated in Industrial Engineering from the Western Institute of Technology and Higher Education (Spanish: Instituto Tecnológico y de Estudios Superiores de Occidente - ITESO).

External links
SEGOB's Website

Mexican businesspeople
Living people
Members of the Congress of Jalisco
Politicians from Jalisco
1996 births